Xie also appearing as  Qi or Xie was an ancient Chinese nobleman, an ancestor of the kings of the Shang dynasty. He is the first known Shang ancestor.

His consort is unknown, but it is known he was a father of Zhao Ming of Shang and grandfather of Xiang Tu.

Xie’s father was Emperor Ku, and Xie’s brothers were Houji, Emperor Zhi and Emperor Yao. Xie’s mother was one of Ku’s consorts ‒ Jiang Yuan, Jiandi, Qingdu, or Changyi.

Notes

Legendary Chinese people
Shang dynasty people